Dhirendra Nath Saha (died 2017) was a Bangladesh Nationalist Party politician and the former Member of Parliament from Narail-1.

Career
Saha was elected to parliament in 1991 and 1996 as a Bangladesh Awami League candidate from Narail-1. He was elected to Parliament from Narail-1 in 2002 in a by-election as a candidate of Bangladesh Nationalist Party. In 2008 he and his son, Shukoch Kumar Shaha, were imprisoned on an extortion case filed by Krishnapada Ghosh, Narail Upazila organising secretary of Bangladesh Awami League. He was sued on 1 November 2008, by Bangladesh Anti Corruption Commission. He was expelled from Bangladesh Nationalist Party in 2008 after he decided to run as an independent candidate from Narail-1.

Death
Saha died in 2017, a condolence message was given by the Parliament of Bangladesh.

References

2017 deaths
Bangladesh Nationalist Party politicians
8th Jatiya Sangsad members
7th Jatiya Sangsad members
6th Jatiya Sangsad members
Bangladeshi Hindus
Year of birth missing